Sabarmati University, formerly Calorx Teachers' University (CTU), is a private university located in Green Woods Campus near Vaishno Devi Circle in Ahmedabad, Gujarat, India.It was founded in 2009 and is recognized by the University Grants Commission.

Constituent institutes
 School of Research & Development
 School of Law
 School of Education
 School of Pure & Applied Sciences
 School of Humanities & Social Sciences
 School of Commerce & Management
 School of Pharmacy
 Department of Distance Education(DDE)

References

External links

Private universities in India
Universities in Ahmedabad
Educational institutions established in 2009
2009 establishments in Gujarat